Quiet Please!: Bawal ang Maingay is a Philippine game show created and produced by TV5 which debuted on August 10, 2014. Quiet Please is based on the game show The Noise.

However, the show ended on January 11, 2015 to give way to the new programs of TV5.

Segments
Round 1: Small but Terrible
Round 2: Major Trouble
Round 3: Salo-Salo Together

Hosts
Richard Gomez
K Brosas

References

Philippine game shows
TV5 (Philippine TV network) original programming
2014 Philippine television series debuts
2015 Philippine television series endings
Filipino-language television shows